Yeni Suvagil (also, Yeni Suvaqil) is a village and municipality in the Zaqatala Rayon of Azerbaijan.  It has a population of 4,554 and is homogenously populated by Tsakhur people.

References 

Populated places in Zaqatala District